Palmulasaurus is a genus of polycotylid plesiosaur from the Turonian Tropic Shale of Utah. It was originally described as Palmula, but the name was occupied by a genus of Cretaceous foraminifer first described in 1833.

See also 
 List of plesiosaurs
 Timeline of plesiosaur research

References 

Polycotylids
Late Cretaceous plesiosaurs of North America
Turonian life
Paleontology in Utah
Fossil taxa described in 2007
Sauropterygian genera